Elizabethtown is an unincorporated community in Guernsey County, in the U.S. state of Ohio.

History
Elizabethtown was platted in 1832.

References

Unincorporated communities in Guernsey County, Ohio
Unincorporated communities in Ohio